The Riddler, a supervillain in DC Comics and an adversary of the superhero Batman, has been adapted into numerous forms of media, including feature films, television series, and video games. The character has been portrayed in live-action by Frank Gorshin and John Astin in the 1960s television series Batman, Jim Carrey in the 1995 film Batman Forever, Cory Michael Smith in the 2014 Fox series Gotham, and Paul Dano in the  2022 film The Batman. Actors who have voiced the Riddler include John Glover in the DC animated universe, Robert Englund in The Batman, and Wally Wingert in the Batman: Arkham video games.

Television

Live-action

The Riddler appears in Batman (1960), portrayed by Frank Gorshin in the first and third seasons and John Astin in the second season. This version was inspired by the Riddler's first Silver Age appearance, with the premiere episode being an adaptation of Batman #171. Gorshin would be nominated for an Emmy Award for his performance, which elevated the character's popularity and turned him into a major member of Batman's rogues gallery.
The Riddler appears in Legends of the Superheroes, portrayed again by Frank Gorshin. This version is a member of the Legion of Doom.
A young Edward Nygma appears in Gotham, portrayed by Cory Michael Smith. This version is a forensic scientist working for the Gotham City Police Department who has a fondness for expressing his findings in the form of riddles before eventually turning to crime and terrorizing Gotham as the Riddler. The series traces his evolution into a master criminal as well as his complicated, love–hate relationship with fellow criminal Oswald Cobblepot.

Animation

DC Animated Universe

The Riddler appears in series set in the DC Animated Universe (DCAU), voiced by John Glover. To avoid confusion with the Joker, the producers of Batman: The Animated Series chose not to portray this version as Frank Gorshin's cackling trickster from the 1960s Batman series; instead portraying Riddler as a smooth intellectual who presents genuinely challenging puzzles and dresses in a sedated version of Gorshin's preferred costume for the character. The series creators also admit they did not use him often because his character often made story plots too long, complex, or bizarre and they found it very hard to devise the villain's riddles.
Riddler first appears in Batman: The Animated Series, with his design consisting of a green suit, purple mask, and a staff that lacks the usual question mark-shaped design. Introduced in the episode "If You're So Smart, Why Aren't You Rich?", Edward Nygma was once a video game developer before he was unjustly fired by his greedy boss, Daniel Mockridge. Following a failed attempt on his life, the Riddler faces Batman on several occasions.
Riddler makes cameo appearances in The New Batman Adventures, now sporting a unitard with a large question mark and no hair and mask.
Riddler makes a minor appearance in the Superman: The Animated Series episode "Knight Time".
An android drone of the Riddler makes a non-speaking cameo appearance in the Batman Beyond episode "Terry's Friend Dates a Robot", in which it fights the new Batman. When asked about Riddler's fate, the show's creator Paul Dini jokingly stated that the Riddler retired and started running a men's clothing store with the Mad Hatter as his partner.
Riddler was originally planned to appear in the third season of Justice League Unlimited as a member of Gorilla Grodd's Secret Society as a tribute to his appearance in Challenge of the Superfriends. However, due to rights issues caused by the "Bat-embargo", this was not possible.

Other shows

The Riddler appears in The Batman/Superman Hour, voiced by Ted Knight.
The Riddler appears in the opening of The New Adventures of Batman. This version sports a red costume instead of the traditional green.
The Riddler appeared in Hanna-Barbera's Challenge of the Superfriends, voiced by Michael Bell. This version is a member of the Legion of Doom who distracts the Super Friends from the Legion's plans by giving them riddles.
The Riddler appears in the 1980s series Super Friends, voiced again by Michael Bell.
The Riddler appears in The Batman (2004), voiced by Robert Englund. This version sports a Gothic appearance and is served by henchmen called Riddlemen. In the past, he and his partner Julie (voiced by Brooke Shields) worked on a device capable of enhancing the human brain when he was approached by a man named Gorman who wanted to purchase the rights to the device, though Nygma refused. When the device malfunctioned at a demonstration, Nygma accused Gorman of sabotaging it and attempted to kill him, only to be foiled by Batman. In the present, Nygma becomes the Riddler to make another attempt on Gorman's life, only to learn Julie was the one who sabotaged their device out of greed, breaking Nygma's heart.
The Riddler appears in Batman: The Brave and the Bold, voiced by John Michael Higgins. Following a minor appearance in the teaser for the episode "A Bat Divided!", the Riddler appears in "The Criss Cross Conspiracy!" as the target of a revenge plot arranged by Batwoman, whom he had publicly unmasked and humiliated ten years prior.
The Riddler appears in Young Justice, voiced by Dave Franco. This version is a member of the Light.
The Riddler appears in the DC Nation Shorts segment "Riddle Me This!", voiced by "Weird Al" Yankovic.
The Riddler makes cameo appearances in Teen Titans Go! (2013).
The Riddler appears in the Justice League Action episode "E. Nygma, Consulting Detective", voiced by Brent Spiner. This version does not wear a mask and has a shaved head.
The Riddler appears in DC Super Hero Girls (2019), voiced by David Hornsby.
The Riddler appears in Harley Quinn, voiced by Jim Rash. This version is a member of the Legion of Doom in the first season and a founding member of the Injustice League in the second season. Additionally, he takes on a muscular physique after being captured by Harley Quinn's crew and being forced to power their mall lair in the latter season. As of the third season, he has returned to his slim physique and entered a relationship with the Clock King. In "Harley Quinn: A Very Problematic Valentine's Day Special", the Riddler proposes to Clock King and the pair get engaged.
The Riddler appears in Batwheels, voiced by SungWon Cho.

Film

Live-action

 The 1960s Batman TV series' incarnation of the Riddler appears in the 1966 film of the same name, portrayed again by Frank Gorshin.
 Edward Nygma / The Riddler appears in Batman Forever, portrayed by Jim Carrey. This version is an eccentric, amoral inventor at Wayne Enterprises who designs "The Box", a device capable of draining people of their intellect. After Bruce Wayne rejects his invention, Nygma becomes the Riddler to prove his superiority to Wayne by obsessively sending him puzzles to solve. Riddler later allies with Two-Face and goes on a crime spree to found his own company, NygmaTech, and mass-produce his technology, allowing him to absorb all of Gotham City's citizens' intelligence and deduce that Bruce Wayne is Batman. Ultimately, Batman overloads the information flowing into Riddler's brain, driving the latter insane before he is incarcerated at Arkham Asylum.
 Edward Nashton / The Riddler appears in The Batman (2022), portrayed by Paul Dano. This version is a masked serial killer, partly inspired by the real-life Zodiac Killer, who seeks to "unmask the truth" about Gotham City by targeting its upper class while taunting Batman and law enforcement with ciphers and riddles. Additionally, Nashton is an orphan with a grudge against Thomas Wayne for not keeping his promise to fund the former's orphanage before his murder, is envious of Bruce Wayne for being an orphan who grew up rich, and ironically idolizes Batman, who served as inspiration for Nashton becoming the Riddler. After throwing Gotham City into disarray by leaking its leadership's corruption and killing the mayor, the police commissioner, the district attorney, and crime boss Carmine Falcone, Nashton allows himself to be captured and imprisoned at Arkham Asylum. Batman then discovers Nashton's true plan is to use explosives around Gotham's breakwaters to flood the city and have his followers assassinate newly elected mayor Bella Reál. After Batman saves Reál, Nashton laments his failure, but befriends the Joker.

Animation
 The Riddler makes a cameo appearance in Batman: Under the Red Hood, with vocal effects provided by Bruce Timm.
 The Riddler appears in Lego Batman: The Movie - DC Super Heroes Unite, voiced by Rob Paulsen.
 The Riddler appears in Batman: Assault on Arkham, voiced by Matthew Gray Gubler. This version is a former member of the Suicide Squad who discovered how to disarm the nano-bombs that the squad's handler, Amanda Waller, implants into the group's members to keep them in line.
 The 1960s Batman TV series incarnation of the Riddler appears in Batman: Return of the Caped Crusaders and Batman vs. Two-Face, voiced again by Wally Wingert.
 The Riddler appears in The Lego Batman Movie, voiced by Conan O'Brien. This version sports slightly longer hair and a smaller hat.
 The Batman: Brave and the Bold incarnation of the Riddler appears in Scooby-Doo! & Batman: The Brave and the Bold, voiced again by John Michael Higgins. It is revealed that he started his career as a lab assistant to Professor Milo and seeks to revive a dimensional portal project he was involved in.
 Edward Nygma appears in Batman: Hush, voiced by Geoffrey Arend. Similarly to the comics, this version deduces Batman's identity as Bruce Wayne while using a Lazarus Pit to cure his brain tumor. However, Nygma goes on to use the alternate alter-ego Hush to manipulate other supervillains into destroying Batman on multiple fronts, while using Clayface to assume his Riddler identity to maintain appearances. Ultimately, Nygma's plans are foiled and he is killed by Catwoman.
 The Riddler makes a non-speaking cameo appearance in Batman: Death in the Family. 
 The Riddler makes a minor non-speaking appearance in Injustice.
 The Riddler appears in Teen Titans Go! & DC Super Hero Girls: Mayhem in the Multiverse, voiced again by an uncredited David Hornsby. This version is a member of the Legion of Doom.

Video games

Batman: Arkham

Edward Nashton / Enigma / The Riddler appears in all four primary installments of the Batman: Arkham video game series, voiced by Wally Wingert. This version had an abusive father who accused him of cheating in a riddle solving contest before beating him. This resulted in Nashton becoming obsessed with riddles and proving his intellectual superiority. He would later go on to become a police consultant and the apparent head of the GCPD's Cybercrime unit, during which he operated as Enigma before eventually becoming the Riddler.
 While the Riddler does not physically appear in Batman: Arkham Asylum (2009), he hacks into Batman's communication system early on in the story and persistently challenges the Dark Knight to solve various riddles located throughout Arkham Island and its various facilities. Upon completing all of the Riddler's challenges, Batman triangulates the former's location in Gotham City and has him arrested by the Gotham City Police Department (GCPD).
 The Riddler makes his first physical appearance in the sequel Batman: Arkham City (2011). He, along with many of Gotham City's criminals and supervillains, is captured and sent to Professor Hugo Strange's Arkham City, a lawless and walled city whose inhabitants are free to wreak havoc. The Riddler kidnaps former Arkham guard Aaron Cash's medical protection team, places them in death traps, and threatens to murder them to force Batman to solve his riddles and challenges, which he has scattered throughout Arkham City. Additionally, the Riddler employs henchmen embedded in the Joker, Penguin and Two-Face's gangs. After Batman eventually outwits the death traps and rescues some of the hostages, Oracle discerns the location of the Riddler's hideout, where Batman rescues the remaining hostages and subdues the Riddler.
 A young Nashton, as Enigma, appears in the prequel Batman: Arkham Origins (2013). He establishes a series of signal jammers throughout Gotham City to disrupt Batman's Batwing and hacking transmitter as part of a plot to blackmail Gotham's most prominent citizens and make the city a better place by ridding it of the corrupt despite putting innocent lives at risk. To further his plot, Nashton also has informants and pieces of extortion recordings scattered throughout Gotham. After uncovering and decoding the recordings and destroying the jammers, Batman finds Enigma's hideout, but the latter has gone into hiding by then.
 In Batman: Arkham Knight (2015), the Riddler has built robots to assist him, established more challenges for Batman throughout all of Gotham, and coerces him into completing them by taking Catwoman hostage via an explosive collar. As he completes the challenges, Batman locates the keys needed to remove Catwoman's collar before the pair confront the Riddler in a "Riddler Mech" and his army of robots. After defeating him, Batman takes the Riddler to GCPD headquarters.
 The Riddler appears as an unlockable playable character in the mobile game Batman: Arkham Underworld. In the game, he wields a sawed-off shotgun along with his cane, which he can use to electrocute enemies, create holograms, and sabotage electronic devices. He can also bring in two of his robotic minions for assistance.

 The Riddler will return in Suicide Squad: Kill The Justice League, as evidenced by the green pinpoint marks with his symbol on them that are seen in the behind the scenes video for the game.

Lego Batman

 The Riddler appears in Lego Batman: The Videogame, with vocal effects provided by Tom Kenny. This version's cane grants him the ability to exert mind control over marked targets or confuse other characters if they are close enough.
 The Riddler appears in Lego Batman 2: DC Super Heroes, voiced by Rob Paulsen impersonating Jim Carrey's interpretation of the character. He serves as a boss in the "Theatrical Pursuits" level and an optional boss and unlockable playable character atop Wayne Tower.
 The Riddler appears as a playable character and boss in Lego Batman 3: Beyond Gotham, voiced by Roger Craig Smith. Additionally, the 1960s Batman TV series incarnation of the Riddler appears as an alternate skin.
 The Riddler appears in Lego Dimensions, voiced again by Roger Craig Smith. After allying himself with Lord Vortech, he takes over Middle-Earth before he is later defeated by a group of heroes.
 The Riddler appears as a playable character in Lego DC Super-Villains, with Wally Wingert reprising his role from the Arkham series.

Other games

 The Riddler appears as a boss in the video game adaptations of Batman: The Animated Series and Batman Forever.
 The Riddler appears as a boss in The Adventures of Batman & Robin, voiced again by John Glover.
 The Riddler appears in DC Universe Online, voiced by Shannon McCormick. This version is a detective who ran afoul of the Joker and receives help from players in the hero campaign to evade Deathstroke.
 The Riddler makes a cameo appearance in Injustice: Gods Among Us as part of the Arkham Asylum stage and stage transition.
 The Riddler appears as a boss in Young Justice: Legacy, voiced by Jason Spisak.
 The Riddler appears in Batman: The Enemy Within, voiced by Robin Atkin Downes. This version is known as "Gotham's original costumed criminal", as he operated whilst the city was controlled by Thomas Wayne and Carmine Falcone. Despite being 60 years old, he is a skilled hand-to-hand combatant and practitioner of Bartitsu, which he uses in conjunction with his cane. A former employee of the Agency's scientific division SANCTUS, he was the only surviving human test subject of their experiments with the "LOTUS virus", a bioweapon that allowed him to maintain his youth but drove him insane. After disappearing for several years, he resurfaces as the leader of a criminal group called the Pact to steal the LOTUS virus as well as pursue personal revenge against the Agency and target Batman. In the midst of his attacks, Lucius Fox is inadvertently killed by a missile strike on Wayne Enterprises. Batman eventually defeats the Riddler, who is assassinated by Lucius' daughter, Tiffany. The Pact and Amanda Waller use the Riddler's body to create their own versions of the LOTUS virus, but their samples are destroyed by Agent Iman Avesta.

Spoofs and parodies
 A parody of the Riddler called the Question Mark appears in the Tiny Toon Adventures episode "Inside Plucky Duck" as part of the segment "Bat's All, Folks!", voiced by Charlie Adler. Additionally, Gogo Dodo dresses as the Batman (1966) incarnation of the Riddler in the pilot episode "The Looney Beginning".
 Frank Gorshin and Adam West parodied the 1994 film Interview with the Vampire as their 1960s Batman characters in a short film for The MTV Movie Awards, with West portraying Brad Pitt's vampire (or "bat-man") and Gorshin as Christian Slater's interviewer.
 The Riddler appears in StarKid Productions production of Holy Musical B@man!, played by Meredith Stepien.
 A character inspired by the Riddler and Mad Libs called the Mad Libber appears in the Drawn Together episode "Captain Girl".
 The Riddler, whose design is based on the Dark Knight Trilogy's villains, appears in an episode of Badman, CollegeHumor's parody of Batman.
 The Riddler appears in the Movie 43 segment "Super Hero Speed Dating", portrayed by Will Carlough. He infiltrates a speed dating establishment disguised as Supergirl.
 The Riddler appears in Robot Chicken, voiced initially by Patrick Warburton and subsequently by Paul Reubens. This version is a member of the Legion of Doom.
 Ned Flanders becomes a parody of the Riddler called the "Diddler" in The Simpsons episode "Revenge Is a Dish Best Served Three Times" as part of the segment "Bartman Begins".

Action figures

 Riddler has made several appearances as an action figure as part of Kenner's Batman: The Animated Series, Legends of Batman, and Batman: Knight Force Ninjas lines; Mattel's The Batman line; and Art Asylum's minimates line. He has also been produced as a HeroClix. Five different Riddler figures were produced for the 1995 Batman Forever line, including a Target exclusive and one that says phrases from the film.
 The Riddler is one of the rarest of Pacipa's Super Amigos line, the Argentinian version of Kenner's Super Powers Collection. He is a repainted Green Lantern figure that was only released in South America. He was also part of the line of action figures called the DC Comics SuperHeroes from Toy Biz.
 Three versions of the Riddler have appeared in the DC Direct line, two based on his first appearance and one based on his look in the "Hush" storyline. The Japanese toy company Yamato has also produced a figure of him.
 Mattel has included two versions of the character in its DC Universe toyline; one in his classic costume, and another in his current costume.
 In 1974, the Mego company released two Riddler figures; one was 8" tall with a cloth outfit for the World's Greatest Superheroes line of toys (this figure was in production until 1979), the other was a smaller figure which was molded rubber over the wire for the Bend 'n Flex line. In 1975 and 1976, Mego also released the 8" tall Fist Fighting Riddler which was basically the same as the 1974 figure except it had a mechanism which allowed a child move a lever on the figure's back to make the arms swing.
 Bearbrick released a DC Superpowers Riddler which was released at 2013 San Diego ComicCon (July 18–21) by Medicom Toy which was limited to only 1500.
 DC Direct has released a Riddler figure in the Batman: Arkham City line.

Music
 During his time on the 1960s television series, Frank Gorshin recorded an album with a song titled "The Riddler", in which he sings of his obsession with puzzles. He performed a musical parody of the character on Dean Martin's variety show in 1966.
 A 1966 album by The Marketts titled The Batman Theme featured a Dick Glasser instrumental song titled "The Riddler".
 A song based on the character titled "The Riddler" was performed by rapper Method Man, and was featured on the Batman Forever soundtrack.
 The Riddler makes an appearance in the video of the Nik Kershaw 1984 song "The Riddle".
 The symphonic metal band Nightwish recorded a song called "The Riddler" on their album Oceanborn.
 Composer Mohammed Fairouz wrote a piano suite based on Batman's rogues gallery. The final movement is titled "The Riddler".

Attractions
 The Riddler's Revenge, the world's tallest and fastest stand-up roller coaster, is themed after the Riddler. It is located in Six Flags Magic Mountain in Valencia, California.
 The Riddler Revenge, a pendulum ride, located at Six Flags Over Texas in Arlington, TX
 Mind Bender is a roller-coaster at Six Flags Over Georgia outside Atlanta, first built in 1978, that in 1997 was re-themed to match the Riddler, after the park built Batman: The Ride alongside it. Mind Bender was given a green paint scheme and its trains were painted black and covered with question marks. The coaster had originally been silver, then was later painted brown.
 La Venganza del Enigma (translated to The Riddler's Revenge) at Parque Warner Madrid is a drop tower painted in Riddler's motif and colors.
 "Riddle Me This" at Six Flags America, is a Round Up painted in Riddler's colors, purple and green.

Other appearances
 The DC Animated Universe (DCAU) incarnation of the Riddler appears in The Batman Adventures. He attempts to reform, but struggles to do so. To help him, Batman recruits the Riddler to answer the riddle of how the Penguin became Gotham's mayor. However, the Clock King beats the Riddler into a coma. While the comic was cancelled before the latter's fate could be resolved, the writers planned to have him come out of his coma with amnesia and attempt to answer the riddle of who he is.
 The DCAU incarnation of the Riddler appears in The Batman and Robin Adventures, with his first appearance seeing him being assisted by Query and Echo.
 The DCAU incarnation of the Riddler appears in Batman: Gotham Adventures.
 A character inspired by the Riddler called Kwiz Kid appears in issue #15 of Teen Titans Go! (2004).
 The Riddler appears in the Injustice: Gods Among Us prequel comic as a patient of Arkham Asylum.
 The Riddler appears in DC Super Hero Girls (2015), voiced by Yuri Lowenthal. This version is a student at Super Hero High.
 In the 2022 audio drama podcast series Batman Unburied, the Riddler teams up with Detective Barbara Gordon to rescue Bruce Wayne.
 The Riddler appears in the radio drama podcast, Batman: The Audio Adventures, voiced by John Leguizamo.

References

DC Comics characters in other media